Sonay Kartal (born 28 October 2001) is a British tennis player.

Kartal has a career-high WTA singles ranking of  195 and a career-high doubles ranking of  559. She has won six ITF singles titles.

Career 
Kartal began playing tennis at aged six and has been playing on the ITF Women's World Tour since 2019. She has won 6 ITF titles.

2021: Comeback, First ITF title 
Kartal won her first title in November 2021, at the Antayla $15k event, beating Amarissa Toth 7-5, 7-5 in the final. This was shortly followed by her second title (and her first on hardcourts) at Monastir $15k, defeating former world no.40 Ayumi Morita in the final 6-1, 6-2. 

Kartal won the women's title at the UK Pro League with a 6-0, 6-1 win over Freya Christie in the final. She ended 2021 ranked 993.

2022: Ranking Rise, WTA and Grand Slam debut. Top 200. 
She followed up her success in late 2021 early in the 2022 season; winning her third title at $25k Birmingham with a 5-7, 6-3, 6-2 win over compatriot Talia Neilson Gatenby. She won a second consecutive $25k title in Glasgow, beating Czech player Barbora Palicova 7-6(5), 7-5. 

Kartal was part of the Great Britain Billie Jean King Cup team for the Qualifying tie in April 2022; where they faced the Czech Republic in Prague. Although she was not selected to play any matches.

In May 2022, she won two consecutive singles titles in the third and fourth weeks of the $25k Nottingham events— beating Danielle Lao 6-1, 6-0, and Joanna Garland 6-3, 6-1 in the finals.

During the grass season, Kartal received wildcards into the main draws at the 2022 Surbiton Trophy, 2022 Ilkley Trophy, and 2022 Nottingham Open. At Surbiton, she defeated Yuriko Miyazaki in the first round before falling in the second round to top seed Madison Brengle. She made her WTA debut with a wildcard at the 2022 Nottingham Open, where she lost in the first round to Camila Giorgi. At Ilkley, she reached her first semi-final at $100k level— losing 6-7(4), 6-7(1) to compatriot Jodie Burrage.

Kartal was awarded a main draw wildcard at the 2022 Wimbledon Championships, where she made her Major debut; losing in the first round to lucky loser Lesley Pattinama Kerkhove, 4-6, 6-3,1-6. 

In August, she entered US Open qualifying for the first time, but lost in the first qualifying round to Spaniard Marina Bassols Ribera in two tiebreak sets.

Kartal posted a quarter final result at $60k Trnava 1, losing to the second seed Vitalia Diatchenko. The next week at $60k Trvana 2, she upset third seed Daria Snigur in the first round, but was forced to retire from her second round match due to injury. However, these performances allowed her to make her top 200 debut. Kartal ended the year ranked 198-  almost 800 places above her 2021 year-end ranking.

2023: Australian Open Qualifying Debut 
At the Australian Open, Kartal lost in three sets to 21st qualifying seed Elizabeth Mandlik in the first qualifying round.

As a wildcard, Kartal entered W60 Sunderland, falling to former top 30 player Mona Barthel  in the quarter-finals.

Grand Slam singles performance timeline

Singles

Doubles

ITF Finals

Singles: 7 (6 titles, 1 runner-up)

Notes

References

External links
 
 

2001 births
Living people
English female tennis players
Tennis people from Greater London